Hughley may refer to:
Hughley, Shropshire, a village and civil parish in Shropshire, UK
The Hughleys, an American sitcom

Surname 
D. L. Hughley (b. 1963), an American actor
George Hughley (1939–1999), an American football fullback
Ella J. Bradley-Hughley (1889–1918), an American operatic soprano soloist and choir director.